Chinnor railway station in Oxfordshire is on the line of the former Watlington and Princes Risborough Railway. The station was reopened by the Chinnor and Princes Risborough Railway Association in 1994 after a period of disuse.

History
First opened in 1872 to serve Chinnor and the surrounding villages, the line was projected to be extended to Wallingford, where it would complete a cross-country line between Cholsey and Princes Risborough. However, due to financial difficulties the Watlington - Wallingford section was never built. The line was always single track.

British Railways closed the Watlington and Princes Risborough Railway to passengers in 1957 and to goods in 1961. The station was demolished but the section of line between Princes Risborough and Chinnor remained open for cement traffic until 1989.

Current access to the station is from the 'wrong' side of the tracks compared with the original layout (i.e. you have to cross the line to get to the station).

Routes

References

Bibliography

External links 
Chinnor & Princes Risborough Railway

Heritage railway stations in Oxfordshire
Former Great Western Railway stations
Railway stations in Great Britain opened in 1872
Railway stations in Great Britain closed in 1957